Christopher Manns (born June 30, 1980) is an American former ice sledge hockey player. He won medals with Team USA at the 2002 Winter Paralympics and 2006 Winter Paralympics.

References

External links 
 

1980 births
Living people
American sledge hockey players
Paralympic sledge hockey players of the United States
Paralympic gold medalists for the United States
Paralympic bronze medalists for the United States
Ice sledge hockey players at the 2002 Winter Paralympics
Ice sledge hockey players at the 2006 Winter Paralympics
Medalists at the 2002 Winter Paralympics
Medalists at the 2006 Winter Paralympics
Ice hockey people from Buffalo, New York
Paralympic medalists in sledge hockey